Simmons v. Simmons, 708 A.2d 949 (1998), was a case decided by the Supreme Court of Connecticut that held that a medical degree is not a property interest subject to division during a divorce proceeding under a marital property regime.

Decision
The plaintiff sought to acquire half of the expected value of her husband's medical degree during divorce proceedings.  The plaintiff provided testimony about the earnings potential associated with a medical degree and sought half of the expected earnings associated with the degree.  The court ruled that the medical degree was not a property interest subject to division, but rather simply an expectancy that may not even vest.

References

External links
 

Property law in the United States
Divorce law in the United States
1998 in United States case law
Connecticut state case law
1998 in Connecticut
United States family case law